The Fall of Paris: The Siege and the Commune, 1870–1871, is a 1965 history of the Paris Commune written by Alistair Horne and published by St. Martin's Press.

Horne paired rewritten chapters from The Fall of Paris with illustrations of the Commune for The Terrible Year: The Paris Commune, 1871, a coffee table book published by Viking Press for the Commune's centennial in 1971.

References

Bibliography

External links 

 Full text at the Internet Archive

1965 non-fiction books
English-language books
Works about the Paris Commune
St. Martin's Press books